Katarzyna Janiszewska (born 26 October 1995) is a Polish handball player for MKS Lublin and the Polish national team.

International honours 
Carpathian Trophy:
Winner: 2017

References

1995 births
Living people
Polish female handball players
People from Sztum
Expatriate handball players
Polish expatriate sportspeople in Germany
21st-century Polish women